Main Madhuri Dixit Banna Chahti Hoon is a 2003 Indian Hindi-language comedy-drama film directed by Chandan Arora and produced by Ram Gopal Varma. The story follows a poor uneducated woman (Antara Mali) who is a huge fan of famous Bollywood actress Madhuri Dixit to the extent that she aspires to become the new Madhuri Dixit by attempting to join the Bollywood film industry. The film was shot in Mumbai, India. The film received decent reviews upon release, with critics praising the films direction.

In keeping with the story line the costume designer (Reza Shariffi) created outfits for the lead character of Chutki which won him nomination in the year 2004 for Zee Cine Award 2004 for Best Costume Design.

Plot 
Chutki (Antara Mali) is an enormous fan of Bollywood film star Madhuri Dixit and pines for the chance to follow in her idol's footsteps. As she makes her wishes known to her parents, she learns that her parents have other plans for her that include an arranged marriage. Chutki's best friend Raja (Rajpal Yadav) shares her dreams and offers to marry her so that they can work on Chutki's acting career. As soon as the two small-town innocents arrive in Mumbai, they learn serious lessons about the hardships of the profession and discover the numerous wannabes in direct competition with Chutki.

Cast 
Antara Mali as Chutki
Rajpal Yadav as Raja
Seema Shinde

Music 
"Tu Ban Jayegi Madhuri" – Nitin Raikwar, Ritika Sahani
"Hai Tumse Mili Nazar" – Remix – Ritika Sahani, Sonu Nigam
"Tumse Mili Nazar To" – Sonu Nigam, Ritika Sahani
"Kaisi Hai Uljhan" – The Duplicates Song – Sudesh Bhosle, Shreya Ghoshal
"Phir Teree Makkhan Mallai" – Poornima
"Rumi Saab" – Mohit Chauhan

References

External links 

2000s Hindi-language films
2003 films
Films scored by Amar Mohile
2003 directorial debut films